Clear-air turbulence is the erratic movement of air masses in the absence of any visual cues.

Clear Air Turbulence may also refer to:

 Clear Air Turbulence (album), an album by the Ian Gillan Band
 Clear Air Turbulence, a fictional space ship in the science fiction novel Consider Phlebas